Thrift may refer to:
 Frugality
 A savings and loan association in the United States
 Apache Thrift, a remote procedure call (RPC) framework
 Thrift (plant), a plant in the genus Armeria
 Syd Thrift (1929–2006), American baseball executive

See also
 
 
 Thrift shop or charity shop
 Thrifty (disambiguation)
 Affluenza
 Anti-consumerism
 Conspicuous consumption
 Downshifting (lifestyle)
 Frugality
 Mottainai
 Over-consumption
 Simple living